Kentucky Route 2053 (KY 2053) is a  state highway in the U.S. State of Kentucky. Its western terminus is at KY 61 in Louisville and its eastern terminus is at U.S. Route 31E (US 31E) and US 150 in Louisville.

Major junctions

References

2053
2053
Transportation in Louisville, Kentucky